Jackson Township is one of fourteen townships in Clinton County, Indiana. As of the 2010 census, its population was 1,173 and it contained 469 housing units.  The township was named for President Andrew Jackson.

History
Jackson was one Clinton County's original townships, created at the first meeting of the county commissioners on May 15, 1830, and remains the largest of the current fourteen.  Its first white settlers were Walter and Anthony Leek who arrived in 1828.

Geography
It includes most of what was known to the pioneers as Twelve Mile Prairie. The unincorporated towns of Cyclone and Manson sit on its eastern and western borders, respectively. A CSX rail line (originally laid down by the Terre Haute, Indianapolis and Eastern Railroad) runs south from Frankfort through the middle of the township.

Unincorporated towns
 Antioch
 Cyclone
 Reagan
(This list is based on USGS data and may include former settlements.)

Adjacent townships
 Center Township (north)
 Michigan Township (northeast)
 Kirklin Township (east)
 Clinton Township, Boone County (southeast)
 Washington Township, Boone County (south)
 Sugar Creek Township, Boone County (southwest)
 Perry Township (west)
 Washington Township (northwest)

Major highways
  Interstate 65
  Indiana State Road 38
  Indiana State Road 39

Cemeteries
The township contains two cemeteries: Allen and Buntin.

References
 
 United States Census Bureau cartographic boundary files

Townships in Clinton County, Indiana
Townships in Indiana
1830 establishments in Indiana